José Augusto Dias (born: 3 February 1959) is a sailor from Brazil, who represented his country at the 1988 Summer Olympics in Busan, South Korea as crew member in the Soling. With helmsman Jose Paulo Dias and fellow crew members Daniel Adler and Christoph Bergman they took the 5th place. José Augusto with helmsman Jose Paulo Dias and fellow crew member Daniel Adler took 13th place during the 1992 Summer Olympics in Barcelona, Spain as helmsman in the Soling.

References

Living people
1959 births
Sailors at the 1988 Summer Olympics – Soling
Sailors at the 1992 Summer Olympics – Soling
Olympic sailors of Brazil
Brazilian male sailors (sport)